The 2009–10 Big Ten Conference men's basketball season marked the continuation of competitive basketball among Big Ten Conference members that began in 1904. On October 16, 2009 five schools celebrated Midnight Madness to mark the beginning of the 2009–10 NCAA Division I men's basketball season.

Michigan State, Ohio State, and Purdue ended the season tied for the conference championship with win–loss records of 14–4, followed by Wisconsin at 13–5. In the 2010 Big Ten Conference men's basketball tournament, Ohio State defeated Minnesota for the championship, and the conference named Evan Turner as the tournament's most outstanding player.  The conference earned five bids to the 2010 NCAA Men's Division I Basketball Tournament by the Co-Champions, runner-up and tournament runner-up.  Big Ten teams posted a 9–5 overall record including three Sweet Sixteen appearances and one Final Four appearance. Two members of the conference received invitations to play in the 2010 National Invitation Tournament (NIT), in which they posted a 2–2 record.

2010 Big Ten Conference Men's Basketball Player of the Year Evan Turner received multiple first team 2010 NCAA Men's Basketball All-Americans and National Player of the Year recognitions.  Trévon Hughes, E'Twaun Moore, Kalin Lucas and Robbie Hummel also received various All-American recognitions.  Moore was also recognized as an Academic All-American.

Preseason
On October 16, 2009 Illinois, Indiana, Michigan State, Michigan, and Minnesota celebrated Midnight Madness, and several other schools celebrated it in the subsequent days.  Michigan State, Purdue and Michigan were ranked in the top 25 by all preseason polls.  The entire 2008–09 All-Big Ten Conference first-team returned: Manny Harris MICH; Kalin Lucas MSU; Evan Turner OSU; Talor Battle PSU; and JaJuan Johnson PUR. The 24-member Big Ten media panel selected Lucas as the preseason conference player of the year, and he was joined on the first team preseason All-Big Ten team by Harris, Turner, Battle and Robbie Hummel PUR.  The same media panel selected Michigan State as the preseason conference favorite followed by Purdue and Ohio State.

Various publications released their preseason predictions for conference standings and All-Big Ten teams.

Predicted Big-Ten Results

 Big Ten Media select only the top three teams

Pre-Season All-Big Ten Teams

Preseason national polls

Preseason watch lists
On August 19, 2009, the Wooden Award preseason watch list included eight Big Ten players. The watch list was composed of 50 players who were not transfers, freshmen or medical redshirts.  The list will be reduced to a 30-player mid-season watch list in December and a final national ballot of about 20 players in March. On October 29, the Naismith College Player of the Year watch list of 50 players was announced.  In late February, a shorter list of the Top 30 was compiled in preparation for a March vote to narrow the list to the four finalists.

Player of the week

In season honors

Players of the week
Throughout the conference regular season, the Big Ten offices named a player of the week each Monday.

Regular season

November
The season opened with the Big Ten Conference holding the leadership with six teams ranked among the preseason top 25 in both the AP Poll and the Coaches' Poll, setting a new conference record for the most teams ranked to open a season.  The season also opened with the entire 2008–09 first team All-Big Ten players returning. Both Manny Harris (November 14) and Evan Turner (November 9) recorded triple doubles in the opening week of the season marking the first times a Big Ten player has accomplished the feat since January 13, 2001.  Six of the eleven conference teams started at least one freshman.  The following week, three schools (Michigan State, Illinois and Iowa) participated in ESPN's Tuesday, November 17 24-hour hoops marathon across its family of networks (ESPN, ESPN2, ESPNU & ESPN360).  Michigan State's Magic Johnson and Jud Heathcote were inducted into the National Collegiate Basketball Hall of Fame on November 22. With his 341st victory, Tom Izzo became Michigan State's all-time leader in basketball coaching victories.  Turner became the second player in conference history to be named conference player of the week three weeks in a row. On November 28, both Ohio State and Michigan State scored 100 points, marking the first time two conference teams have done so since December 22, 1997.

December
For the second time in the season, two teams scored 100 points on the same night on December 5.  For the first time in eleven attempts, the Big Ten won the ACC – Big Ten Challenge.  In his 275th game, Bo Ryan reached the 200-win milestone with Wisconsin Badgers men's basketball. In the same week, Tom Crean raised his record to 200-–125.   The Big Ten entered intraconference play tied with the Big East Conference by having five ranked teams. Northwestern entered conference play on its longest winning streak in 16 years (9), and Purdue reached the 11–0 mark for the second time and had a perfect record at the end of December for the first time since the 1936–37 season.

January
Purdue ran its record to 14–0 to start the season, which tied the Glenn Robinson-led 1993–94 Purdue Boilermakers for the best start in school history. Four Big Ten athletes (Talor Battle, Harris, Trevon Hughes and Lucas) were named as finalists for the 2010 Bob Cousy Award to lead all conferences. Harris, Lucas, Robbie Hummel and Turner were also selected Midseason Top 30 finalists for the 2010 John Wooden Award. On January 12, Hummel and Turner became only the third pair of opposing Big Ten players to post 30 points against each other in one night. Michigan State established a new school record by winning its first eight conference games and extended the streak to nine by the end of the month.

February
On February 8 Turner recorded his fifth Conference Player of the Week award and eighth of his career surpassing the former conference record held by Glenn Robinson and Jim Jackson, who each had seven career and tied Robinson's single-season record with five.  Two weeks later he set the single-season record with his sixth recognition when he averaged 24.5 points, 8.5 rebounds and 5.5 assists against two ranked opponents (No. 4 Purdue and at No. 11 Michigan State). Three Big Ten players made the February Top 30 midseason Naismith College Player of the Year watch list: Hummel, Lucas and Turner.  Hummel and Turner were selected among the 16 finalists for the 2010 Oscar Robertson Trophy.

March
Turner was selected as one of six finalists for the Bob Cousy Award.  Lucas, Hummel and Turner were included on the final 26-man ballot for the Wooden Award.

Rankings

During the season, seven of the Big Ten teams received enough votes to be ranked and an eight team received voted during several weekly polls.  Michigan State and Purdue were ranked during every weekly poll during the season.

Preconference

Tournaments
Big Ten teams emerged victorious in the following tournament:

*Although these tournaments include more teams, only 4 play for the championship.

ACC–Big Ten Challenge
The Big Ten Conference won the 11th annual ACC – Big Ten Challenge for the first time in the challenge's history.

Conference play
The 2009–10 season marked the third consecutive year that every Big Ten men's basketball conference regular-season and tournament game was nationally televised. In excess of 100 games appeared nationally on CBS, ESPN, ESPN2 or the Big Ten Network every Tuesday, Wednesday, Thursday, Saturday and Sunday during conference play beginning on December 29.  All ten games of the March 11 – 14, 2010 Big Ten Conference men's basketball tournament were nationally televised.

With an eighteen-game in-conference schedule, each team met eight teams twice (home and away) and the two other teams only once.  The following were the one-time meetings for this season.

Conference honors
Two sets of conference award winners were recognized by the Big Ten - one selected by league coaches and one selected by the media.

All-Big Ten Academic team
The Big Ten Conference had 33 men's basketball letterwinners who were in at least their second academic year at their institution and who maintained a cumulative grade point average (GPA) of 3.0 or higher during the winter semester to earn Big Ten Academic All-Conference honors.  Purdue's Mark Wohlford who was a senior economics major had a perfect Winter GPA.  These student-athletes were eligible to be named Distinguished Scholar Awardees if they maintained a 3.7 GPA for the entire academic year.

National awards & honors

National awards
Turner was named the winner of the Oscar Robertson Trophy by the United States Basketball Writers Association as the consensus choice by voters in all nine geographical districts.  Fox and Sporting News selected Turner as National Player of the Year. He was also recognized the National Association of Basketball Coaches' Division I Player of the Year and was honored as the Naismith Award recipient.  In addition to his basketball honors, Turner was selected as the male Big Ten Athlete of the Year for all sports.

NABC
The National Association of Basketball Coaches announced their Division I All-District teams on March 16, recognizing the nation's best men's collegiate basketball student-athletes. Selected and voted on by member coaches of the NABC, 240 student-athletes, from 24 districts were chosen. The selection on this list were then eligible for the State Farm Coaches' Division I All-America teams announced at the 2009 NABC Convention in Detroit. The following list represented the Big Ten players chosen to the list. (All Big Ten schools are within District 7 for the 2009–10 season.)

First Team
Kalin Lucas Michigan State
Evan Turner Ohio State
Demetri McCamey Illinois
E'Twaun Moore Purdue
Robbie Hummel Purdue
Second Team
John Shurna Northwestern
Trévon Hughes Wisconsin
DeShawn Sims Michigan
Talor Battle Penn. State
Manny Harris Michigan

USBWA
On March 9, the U.S. Basketball Writers Association released its 2009–10 Men's All-District Teams, based on voting from its national membership. There were nine regions from coast to coast, and a player and coach of the year were selected in each. The following lists all the Big Ten representatives selected within their respective regions.

District II (NY, NJ, DE, DC, PA, WV)
None Selected
District V (OH, IN, IL, MI, MN, WI)
Player of the Year
Evan Turner, Ohio State
Coach of the Year
Matt Painter, Purdue
All-District Team
Trévon Hughes, Wisconsin
Robbie Hummel, Purdue
JaJuan Johnson, Purdue
Kalin Lucas, Michigan State
Demetri McCamey, Illinois
E'Twaun Moore, Purdue
Evan Turner, Ohio State
District VI (IA, MO, KS, OK, NE, ND, SD)
None Selected

Academic honors

CoSIDA

On February 4, 2010, the College Sports Information Directors of America (CoSIDA) and ESPN the Magazine selected their Academic All-Americans from throughout college basketball. CoSIDA has selected Academic All American teams since 1952. To be nominated, a student-athlete must be a starter or important reserve with at least a 3.30 cumulative grade point average (on a 4.0 scale) at his/her current institution. Nominated athletes must have participated in at least 50 percent of the team's games at the position listed on the nomination form (where applicable). No student-athlete is eligible until he has completed one full calendar year at his current institution and has reached sophomore athletic eligibility. In the cases of transfers, graduate students and two-year college graduates, the student-athlete must have completed one full calendar year at the nominating institution to be eligible. Nominees in graduate school must have a cumulative GPA of 3.30 or better both as an undergrad and in grad school. Michigan's Zack Novak was a District 4 first-team 2009 Academic All-District Men's Basketball Team selection and Purdue's E'Twaun Moore was a District 5 selection, making them 2 of the 40 finalists for the 15-man Academic All-American team. On February 22, Moore was selected as a second-team Academic All-American.

Big Ten Distinguished Scholar Award
Purdue's senior economics major Mark Wohlford was the conference's only men's basketball distinguished scholar by achieving the minimum grade-point average (GPA) of 3.7 or higher.

All-American

Sporting News selected Evan Turner as a first-team All-American and Trevon Hughes as a fifth-team All-American. Turner was also a first team selection by Associated Press (AP), Fox Sports, United States Basketball Writers Association, National Association of Basketball Coaches (NABC) and Yahoo! Sports. Yahoo! recognized E'Twaun Moore as a third-team selection and both Trevon Hughes and Kalin Lucas as honorable mentions. Fox recognized Robbie Hummel as a third-team selection, while the NABC recognized him as a second team selection. The AP recognized Moore, Hummel and Lucas as honorable mentions.  As top 10 finalists for the Lowe's Senior CLASS Award, Chris Kramer (1st team) and Raymar Morgan (2nd team) were regarded as Senior All-Americans.

Postseason

Big Ten tournament

Evan Turner of the champion Buckeyes was named Tournament Most Outstanding Player. He was joined on the All-Tournament team by Ohio State teammates William Buford and David Lighty, former high school teammate Demetri McCamey of Illinois and Devoe Joseph of Minnesota.  Turner led Ohio State with late game heroics in the first two games and a championship game record total number of points in the finals.

NCAA tournament

In the NCAA tournament, the Big Ten Conference earned 5 invitations. These teams combined for 9 wins, and three teams reached the sweet sixteen round and Michigan State reached the final four.

National Invitation tournament

The Big Ten earned two postseason National Invitation Tournament invitations.  Its teams combined for 2 wins and 2 losses, with Illinois earning both wins.

Other tournaments

The Big Ten did not have any entrants in the other post season tournaments.

2010 NBA Draft
Turner was the only Big Ten player selected in the 2010 Draft. The following All-Big Ten performers were listed as seniors: Trévon Hughes, Jason Bohannon, and DeShawn Sims. The following were All-Big Ten underclassmen, who declared early with the intent to hire agents: Evan Turner and Manny Harris. Neither withdrew his name from the draft-eligible list before the May 8 deadline. The following were All-Big Ten underclassmen who entered their name in the draft but who did not hire agents and opted to return to college: Talor Battle, Mike Davis, JaJuan Johnson, Demetri McCamey, and E'Twaun Moore.

See also
2009 Big Ten Conference football season

Notes

External links
Big Ten website